Émile-Bernard Donatien (1887–1955) was a French actor, writer, set designer and film director. Born Emile Wessbecher to Alsatian parents in Paris, he was often credited simply as Donatien. He retired from cinema in 1932, devoting himself to sculpting and painting. He was married to the actress Lucienne Legrand with whom he frequently worked.

Selected filmography
 I Have Killed (1924)
 Princesse Lulu (1925)
 Nantas (1925)
 Simone (1926)
 Florine, la fleur du Valois (1927)
 The Martyrdom of Saint Maxence (1928)
 Miss Edith, Duchess (1929)

References

Bibliography
 Rège, Philippe. Encyclopedia of French Film Directors, Volume 1. Scarecrow Press, 2009.

External links

1887 births
1955 deaths
French male film actors
Male actors from Paris
French art directors
Film directors from Paris
20th-century French male actors